Severinia can refer to:

Severinia (plant), a genus of flowering plants in the family Rutaceae
Severinia, a genus of mantises in the family Toxoderidae  
Severínia, a city in Brazil